The Mid-Eastern Athletic Conference baseball tournament was the conference baseball championship of the NCAA Division I Mid-Eastern Athletic Conference. In its final edition in 2022, all four MEAC baseball teams participated in the double elimination tournament at Marty L. Miller Field in Norfolk, Virginia. The winner of the tournament received an automatic berth to the NCAA Division I Baseball Championship. The automatic bid was granted beginning in 1994.

From 1999 until leaving the conference after the 2021 season, Bethune-Cookman had claimed all but six tournament championships, as North Carolina A&T won the 2005 and 2018 tournaments, Savannah State won the 2013 tournament, Florida A&M won the 2015 and 2019 events, while Norfolk State won in 2021. Coppin State won the last MEAC tournament in 2022.

The MEAC merged its baseball league into that of the Northeast Conference (NEC) after the 2022 season, by which time it had only four baseball-sponsoring members—two short of the minimum required for a conference to maintain its automatic tournament bid. The remaining MEAC baseball schools became NEC affiliates at that time.

Champions

By year
The following is a list of conference champions and sites listed by year.

By school
The following is a list of conference champions listed by school, since 1972.

Italics indicate the school stopped fielding a baseball team in the MEAC before the conference's final baseball season in 2022.

References